The 1967 World Table Tennis Championships men's doubles was the 29th edition of the men's doubles championship.
Hans Alsér and Kjell Johansson won the title after defeating Anatoly Amelin and Stanislav Gomozkov in the final by three sets to two.

Results

See also
List of World Table Tennis Championships medalists

References

-